The Matthew Shepard Story is a 2002 made-for-television film directed by Roger Spottiswoode, based on the true story of Matthew Shepard, a 21-year-old gay youth who was murdered in 1998. The film scenario written by John Wierick and Jacob Krueger, it starred Shane Meier as Matthew and Stockard Channing as Judy Shepard and Sam Waterston as Dennis Shepard.

Producers were Alliance Atlantis Communications, with the assistance/participation of CTV and Cosmic Entertainment, with support from the Cdn. Film or Video Production Tax Credit (CPTC). The film premiered on NBC on March 16, 2002, the same day HBO aired another Shepard film entitled The Laramie Project. The Matthew Shepard Story was also shown on CTV, with language versions shown in many countries.

Plot
In 1998, a young gay man by the name of Matthew Shepard (Shane Meier) was robbed, viciously beaten and left tied to a fence to die. Although he's found by the police, rescued and hospitalized, he dies from his injuries. This film recounts the events after the conviction of the two men responsible for this hate motivated murder.

Matthew's parents, though satisfied by the conviction, are finding the sentencing phase of the trial more difficult. The parents initially want to request the death penalty for their son's murderers, but the mother, Judy Shepard (Stockard Channing), starts to reconsider. As they struggle with their decision, they decide to reexamine the life of their son and rediscover his personality, his struggle to accept his homosexuality as a natural part of his being and above all, his generous humanity to others. All of this leads the parents to appeal to the court the way their son would have wanted, not out of vengeance but to represent best of what their son was and the tragedy of his loss.

Cast
 Shane Meier as Matthew Shepard
 Stockard Channing as Judy Shepard
 Sam Waterston as Dennis Shepard
 Wendy Crewson as Sarah
 Kristen Thomson as Romaine Patterson
 Joseph Ziegler as Cal
 Yani Gellman as Pablo
 Damien Atkins as Donny
 Philip Eddolls as Aaron McKinney
 Paul Robbins as Russell Henderson
 Judah Katz as Defense Attorney
 Drew Nelson as Lance
 Nazneen Contractor as Shima
 Makyla Smith as Casey
 Lindsay Murrell as Matthew's Date
 James Bearden as Protester
 B.J. McLellan as Logan Shepard (age 17)
 David Broadhurst as Logan Shepard (age 12)
 Shawna Lori Burnett as Female Officer
 John Henry Canavan as Painter
 Bruce Beaton as Cowboy
 Brian Frank as Neighbour
 Sadie LeBlanc as Girlfriend
 Jim Codrington as Health Food Store Manager
 Dorothy Gordon as Elderly Woman
 Susan Chuang as Female News Anchor
 Richard Blackburn as Judge
 Ray Kahnert as The Minister
 Patricia Carroll Brown as Angry Mourner
 Dinah Watts as Cal's Secretary
 Eduardo Gómez as Gomez
 Scott McLaren as Drug Dealer
 Derek Gilroy as Mike
 Scott Wickware as The Bartender

Awards and nominations
The film went on to win several awards and nominations for others:
Awards
"Best Performance by an Actor in a Leading Role" for Shane Meier as Matthew Shepard at the 2003 Los Angeles Outfest
Emmy Award in 2002 for "Outstanding Supporting Actress in a Miniseries or a Movie" for Stockard Channing for her role as Judy Shepard
Outstanding Performance by a Female Actor in a Television Movie or Miniseries at the 2003 Screen Actors Guild Awards for Stockard Channing.
Sam Waterston won a Gemini Award for "Best Performance by an Actor in a Featured Supporting Role in a Dramatic Program or Mini-Series".
The writers John Wierick and Jacob Krueger won the Paul Selvin Honorary Award given by Writers Guild of America
Nominations
Outstanding Television Movie at the 2003 GLAAD Media Awards
"Best Writing in a Dramatic Program or Mini-Series" for writers Jacob Krueger and John Wierick at the 2003 Gemini Awards
"Best Performance by an Actress in a Miniseries or a Motion Picture Made for Television" for Stockard Channing at the 2003 Satellite Awards

Soundtrack
The film also contains soundtrack album with the following:
"Matthew Songs" – Written, performed and produced by Jim Huff
"El Burkan" – Written by Hossam Ramzy
"I Keep Holdin' On" – Written by T. Leonard and A. Lerman, performed by Fathead
"Lonesome World" – Written and performed by Paul Kass
"Good Vibration" – Written by Mladen Borosak and Tom Barlow, performed by Twigg
"Naked in the Water" – Written and performed by Michaela Foster Marsh
"Shine" – Written Rob Garnder, Kadru Gardner and Mike Thibeau, performed by Electrostatic
"I Want You to Fall" – Written and performed by Monica Schroeder
"Get You Some" – Written by Robert J. Walsh, Ron Chick, Dennis Winslow
"Edge of a Dream" – Written by Billy Livesay and David Graham, performed by Billy Livesay
"Who'll Hold On" – Written and performed by Adam Daniel
"American Triangle" – Written by Elton John and Bernie Taupin, performed by Elton John
"What Matters" – Written and performed by Randi Driscoll

See also
 Anatomy of a Hate Crime (film)
Cultural depictions of Matthew Shepard
The Laramie Project (film)

References

External links

Works about Matthew Shepard
2002 television films
2002 films
2002 crime drama films
2002 LGBT-related films
2002 biographical drama films
American biographical drama films
American crime drama films
American LGBT-related television films
Biographical television films
Canadian biographical drama films
Canadian crime drama films
Canadian LGBT-related television films
Crime films based on actual events
Crime television films
American drama television films
English-language Canadian films
Films directed by Roger Spottiswoode
Films scored by Jeff Danna
Films scored by Mychael Danna
Films set in the 1990s
Films set in Wyoming
Gay-related films
Homophobia in fiction
LGBT-related drama films
Biographical films about LGBT people
Films about anti-LGBT sentiment
Canadian drama television films
2000s American films
2000s Canadian films